Alexandra Nicole Hulme, also known as Lexy Hulme, is an American actress, dancer, choreographer and artist. She is known for her work with Lawrie Brewster and Joseph Gordon-Levitt.

Select filmography

Film
 (500) Days of Summer (2009, dancer)
 Post (2011, Lolita)
 A Glimpse Inside the Mind of Charles Swan III (2012, Yvonne)
 Raptor Ranch (2012, Kolin)
 Lord of Tears (2013, Eve Turner)
 Kids vs Monsters (2015, Rebecca) 
 The Black Gloves (2017, Elisa Grey)
 The Devil's Machine (2019)

Short films
 The Waterson Project (2006, Sexy distraction)
 A Portrait of Love (2007)
 Morgan M. Morgansen's Date with Destiny (2010, Destiny)
 Morgan and Destiny's Eleventeenth Date: The Zeppelin Zoo (2010, Destiny)
 Gray Dog (2013, Gray Dog)
 The Nutcracked (2015, Clara)
 The Romantics (2015, Vanessa)
 Azure (2016, Helena von Thurnau)

Television
 A House Divided (2006, TV movie, Lt. Walnut)
 Girls (2017, 1 episode, as Crystal)

References

External links

American female dancers
Living people
American film actresses
American television actresses
Year of birth missing (living people)
21st-century American dancers
21st-century American actresses